General Zahl is a fictional character appearing in American comic books published by DC Comics. Initially known as Captain Zahl, he is a former German Navy officer and enemy of the  Doom Patrol.

Publication history
General Zahl first appeared in Doom Patrol #121 (October 1968), and was created by Bruno Premiani and Murray Boltinoff.

Fictional character biography
During World War II, Captain Zahl was an officer in the German Navy and commanded a U-boat. As a U-boat captain, Zahl was ruthless and effective, achieving the highest kill number of any commander in the German fleet. After his boat was sank by anti U-boat bombs developed by Dr. Niles Caulder, he was crippled and forced to wear a neck brace.

After the end of World War II, he worked as a mercenary, until a conflict with the Doom Patrol forced him to retire. Later, Zahl (now calling himself "General Zahl") assisted Madame Rouge in seemingly killing the Doom Patrol, who sacrificed themselves to save the lives of a small town. It was later revealed that Robotman survived, but was heavily injured in the explosion.

Years later, the Teen Titans, together with Robotman, tracked down Zahl and Rouge during their attempted takeover of Zandia. With the help of Changeling and the Brotherhood of Evil, they put a stop to their plans. Near the conflict's end, General Zahl fired upon Robotman but the bullets ricocheted from his chest and struck Zahl, killing him.

Powers and abilities
Despite possessing no superhuman abilities, Zahl is a skilled military commander.

In other media
General Zahl appears in the Batman: The Brave and the Bold episode "The Last Patrol!", voiced by Corey Burton. This version caused the Doom Patrol to disband and retire years prior after they failed to stop him from killing a hostage he had taken. In the present, he forms an alliance with the Brain, Monsieur Mallah, Animal-Vegetable-Mineral Man, Mutant Master, and Arsenal to seek revenge on the Doom Patrol by exposing them as frauds. However, he and his alliance are defeated by Batman while the Doom Patrol sacrifice themselves to save a small town Zahl was threatening, which causes the world to appreciate them even more.

References

External links
 General Zahl at DC Comics Wiki
 General Zahl at Comic Vine

DC Comics supervillains
DC Comics male supervillains
DC Comics Nazis
Comics characters introduced in 1968
Doom Patrol
Fictional mass murderers
Fictional generals
Fictional ship captains
Fictional Nazi fugitives
Fictional mercenaries in comics